Andrij Myronenko (born 8 December 1994) is a Ukrainian professional basketball player for Keila KK of the Latvian-Estonian Basketball League.

With BC Dnipro, Myronenko won the SuperLeague Cup in 2016, the first in his career.

External links
 BC Dnipro profile
 FIBA Europe
 Andrij Myronenko at basketball.eurobasket.com

References 

BC Dnipro players
Ukrainian men's basketball players
1994 births
Living people
Place of birth missing (living people)
Forwards (basketball)
BC Zaporizhya players
Universiade silver medalists for Ukraine
Universiade medalists in basketball
Medalists at the 2019 Summer Universiade